Methylecgonine cinnamate is a natural tropane alkaloid found within the coca plant. Its more common name, cinnamoylcocaine, reflects its close structural similarity to cocaine. It is pharmacologically inactive, but some studies funded by anti-drug agencies imply that it is active when smoked. Furthermore, the discovery of differing impurity products yielding methylecgonine cinnamate in confiscated cocaine have led enforcing agencies to postulate that illicit manufacturers have changed their oxidation procedures when refining cocaine from a crude form. Methylecgonine cinnamate can dimerize to the truxillic acid derivative truxilline. It is notable that methylecgonine cinnamate is given in patents of active cocaine analogue structures.

See also 
 Coca alkaloids
 Cocaethylene
 Salicylmethylecgonine

References

External links
Isolation of cis-Cinnamoylcocaine from Crude Illicit Cocaine via Alumina Column Chromatography D.E.A. Microgram Vol 4 Number 14.

Tropane alkaloids found in Erythroxylum coca
Cinnamate esters
Methyl esters